Riot is a 2014 American game show comedy television series from Fox Broadcasting Company and based upon the Australian Slide Show television series, itself based upon the Arthur-created French program Vendredi tout est permis ("On Fridays, Anything Goes with Arthur", aka Anything Goes), where two teams of celebrities competed in a number of challenges and games, including one on a huge set that tilts at 22½ degrees.  Hosted by Rove McManus, weekly episode "guest" captains include a rotating set of actors, with Andy Buckley and Steve Carell "captaining" the premiere episode. Riot was canceled by Fox on June 12, 2014.

Format
The show's concept places two teams of celebrities and comedians in a series of competitions that have the teams sing, dance and create comedy sketches while overcoming multiple mental and physical obstacles. Instructed by guest team captains, two teams of comedians are instructed to create and participate in a set of unscripted improv skits, some of which take place on a set tilted at 22-1/2 degrees  or some of which take place in complete darkness with the audience able to observe through night-vision cameras while the contestants blunder about.

Regular cast
The series "regular" main cast includes
  
 Rove McManus as host
 Brian Palermo 
 John Ross Bowie 
 Jamie Denbo 
 Jordan Black 
 Rob Gleeson 
 Meryl Hathaway 
 Jessica McKenna

Guest stars
Weekly episode "guest" team captains include a rotating set of actors, including:

 Jason Alexander
 David Arquette
 Mayim Bialik
 Michael Ian Black
 Andy Buckley
 Steve Carell
 Rob Delaney
 Andy Dick
 Tom Green
 Cheryl Hines
 D.L. Hughley
 Orlando Jones
 Chris Kattan
 Oscar Nunez
 Will Sasso
 Nicole Sullivan

Games
 Slide Show: Players perform a scene on a set built at a 22-degree angle with the cameras tilted to make the floor appear to be level.  This game is played twice per episode.
 A Bunch of Jerks: Several players act out scenes wearing suits attached to cables from the studio rafters and when anyone makes a mistake, they are jerked up nearly 20 feet off the floor.
 Mime Sweeper: A performer stands on a pedestal and has ten seconds to mime the identity of an image shown on a screen to another whose back is turned to the screen.  Every time the second performer fails to guess the image, the first performer is knocked off by a large medicine ball and is replaced by another.
 Alphabody: Two players form the letters in a four-letter word in any order using only their bodies for ten seconds per letter.  After the last letter is formed, the host tries to guess the word.
 In The Dark: Players act out a scene in a pitch-black room, while those in the studio can see everything due to infra-red cameras.
 Shadow Puppets: Players act out movie titles, etc. behind a back-lit white screen for another to guess.
 Floored: Players perform on the floor while an overhead camera makes them appear to be standing.
 Dogs at Work: A dog is dressed like a human, with human hands using the sleeves to interact with players.

Development and production
In October 2013, Fox greenlit production of an American version of Vendredi Tout est Permis Avec Arthur, from Steve Carell and Shine America, to be produced by Shine America with Carell’s banner, Carousel TV.

Episodes

Reception
Riot received mixed reviews from television critics, and currently has a Metacritic score of 63 out of 100 based on 5 reviews. Neil Genzlinger of The New York Times wrote "There’s no describing how hysterical this is; you have to see it." Diane Werts of Newsday wrote "Is there anything great here? No. Is it goofy fun? Yes.  BOTTOM LINE Silly fun in the summertime." Brian Lowry of Variety wrote "If imitation is the sincerest form of flattery (and television), those responsible for Whose Line Is It Anyway? should be positively red-faced watching Riot, Fox’s amped-up, exhausting new improv show. Lowry expanded that even with the creativity and comedy of the various skits, the show's "stunt-enhanced physical gags" do not quite merit the name "Riot". Neil Drumming of Salon said the "premiere felt like harmless summer programming, though a bit manic for my tastes."

Release
Shine America's parent company represents the format internationally, and apart from the Australian and French versions, local-language versions of the show have screened in Thailand, Finland, Portugal, Denmark, Spain, Brazil, Ukraine and Romania. Vietnam

Cancellation
After just four weeks, Fox pulled Riot from its Tuesday night schedule due to extremely poor ratings. The show's initial ratings and viewer response was mixed, debuting mid-May with a 0.5 rating in the 18–49 demographic with 1.34 million viewers, and for episodes 3 and 4, Riot drew a 0.4 rating in the same demographic. Fox stated they would eventually find a better time-slot for the show, and will fill the Tuesday slot with re-runs of more popular shows.

International versions
The international rights are produced by Satisfaction – The Television Agency and distributed by Endemol Shine Group.

References

External links
 
 Riot at the Internet Movie Database

Endemol Shine Group franchises
2014 American television series debuts
2014 American television series endings
2010s American game shows
2010s American sketch comedy television series
American television series based on French television series
American television series based on Australian television series
English-language television shows
Fox Broadcasting Company original programming
Improvisational television series